Darbandy Olya (also Romanized as Darbandy ‘Olyā; also known as Darbandy zhūr, Darbandī-ye ‘Olyā, Darbandy Bālā, and Darbandy Qeshlāq) is a village in Miankuh Rural District, Chapeshlu District, Dargaz County, Razavi Khorasan Province, Iran. According to the 2006 census, its population was 599, with 128 families.

References 

Populated places in Dargaz County